Stanley "Kip" Jordan was an American soccer defender who was a 1973 first team All American, then spent three seasons in the North American Soccer League (NASL).
 
Jordan attended Cornell University, playing on the men's soccer team from 1970-1973.  He was a 1972 Honorable Mention (third team) and a 1973 first team All American. Jordan graduated in 1974 and was a member of the Quill and Dagger society. He was inducted with the inaugural class into Cornell's Athletic Hall of Fame in 1978.  In 1974, Jordan signed with the Miami Toros of the North American Soccer League.  He moved to the Rochester Lancers for the 1976 season. In 1978, he played in Canada's National Soccer League with the Buffalo Blazers.

References

External links
 NASL Stats

American soccer players
Cornell Big Red men's soccer players
North American Soccer League (1968–1984) players
Miami Toros players
Rochester Lancers (1967–1980) players
Year of birth missing (living people)
Living people
Sportspeople from Rochester, New York
Soccer players from New York (state)
All-American men's college soccer players
Association football defenders
Canadian National Soccer League players